Reidsville Historic District is a national historic district located at Reidsville, Rockingham County, North Carolina. It encompasses 324 contributing buildings, 1 contributing site, 11 contributing structures, and 1 contributing object in the central business district and surrounding residential sections of Reidsville.  It was developed between about 1865 and 1941, and includes notable examples of Italianate, Queen Anne, American Craftsman, and Classical Revival style architecture.  Located in the district are the separately listed Penn House and Gov. David S. Reid House.  Other notable buildings include the Oaks-Motley House (c. 1865), Colonel A. J. Boyd House (mid-1870s), Reid Block (1880s), Citizens' Bank Building, William Lindsey and company Tobacco Factory, First Baptist Church, Main Street Methodist Church, Melrose (1909) designed by architect Richard Gambier, R. L. Watt house designed by Willard C. Northup, First Presbyterian Church (1922), St. Thomas Episcopal Church, Grand Theatre, Belvedere Hotel, United States Post Office and Federal Building, and the Municipal Building (1926).

It was listed on the National Register of Historic Places in 1987.

References

Historic districts on the National Register of Historic Places in North Carolina
Neoclassical architecture in North Carolina
Italianate architecture in North Carolina
Queen Anne architecture in North Carolina
Buildings and structures in Rockingham County, North Carolina
National Register of Historic Places in Rockingham County, North Carolina